Chloe Goodman (born 10 June 1993) is a former glamour model, and TV personality.

Career
Goodman has been a Page 3 model. In a Channel 4 News debate about The Sun'''s use of topless models she argued against Germaine Greer and Harriet Harman stating "Why should feminist women then tell other women how to live their lives? Women fought together to get the vote and so on and so forth, so why should women now be fighting each other, and tell each other what job roles to now take within the industry?".

She appeared on the first series of Ex on the Beach and starred in all 8 episodes. In 2015, she took part in the fifteenth series of Celebrity Big Brother, she was involved in a controversial incident leading to the removal of Jeremy Jackson. She was the first housemate of the season to be evicted, on Day 10. She has also appeared on This Morning and Lorraine and was a participant in NHS in Crisis: The Live Debate (2015). Off the back of her appearance on Celebrity Big Brother she became the face of Lovehoney Lingerie.

In 2016, she returned to Ex on the Beach'' for its All Star series.

References

External links

1993 births
Living people
Participants in British reality television series